György Paál (Budapest, 1934 – Budapest, 1992)  was a Hungarian astronomer and cosmologist.

Work 
In the late 1950s Paál studied the quasar and galaxy cluster distributions. In 1970 from redshift quantization he came up with the idea that the Universe might have nontrivial topological structure.

These are the oldest papers that associate real observations with the possibility that our universe could have nontrivial topology.

Membership 

Cosmological Committee of IAU

Awards 

László Detre award.

See also
Accelerating universe
Cosmological constant
Dark energy
Redshift quantization
Universe
Shape of the universe

References

20th-century Hungarian astronomers
Cosmologists
1934 births
1992 deaths